Krzysztof Sacha (born September 2, 1970) is a Polish theoretical physicist. He is currently Professor of Physics at the Jagiellonian University in Cracow.

Personal life
Krzysztof Sacha was born on September 2, 1970 in Kłodzko together with his twin brother Jerzy Sacha. In 1996 he married Ewa, with whom he has two children Aleksandra and Wojciech.

Education
He received a Master of Science in Physics in 1995 and a Ph.D. in Physics in 1998, both with distinction, from Jagiellonian University. 
In 1999 he was given Award of Ministry of Polish Education for PhD thesis. He continued his work in Jagiellonian University, in 1999-2000 in Philipps University Marburg with Fellowship of the Alexander von Humboldt Foundation, and in 2005-2006 in Los Alamos National Laboratory with Fulbright Fellowship. In 2004 he earned Habilitation in physics in Jagiellonian University and in 2011 he was awarded title of  Professor of Physics.

Research
Krzysztof Sacha researches atomic physics. He is known for his work on Bose–Einstein condensate fluctuations, solitons, Eckhardt-Sacha model of nonsequential triple ionization, first proposal of symmetry breaking of discrete time translation symmetry - Time crystals and many other works on dynamical phases of matter

References 

1970 births
Polish physicists
Academic staff of Jagiellonian University
Kłodzko
Living people